The Cape Wickham Lighthouse is a lighthouse situated at Cape Wickham on King Island, Tasmania. The lighthouse is listed on the Commonwealth Heritage Register.

There are eleven timber flights of stairs in the lighthouse, with twenty steps each, which must be climbed in order to reach the top.  Surrounding the lighthouse are the remains of a number of associated buildings, including a small church.  There are also a number of gravestones, many belonging to those who were shipwrecked in the area after the lighthouse was built.

History

The lighthouse was originally established in 1861, in response to the sinking of the barque Cataraqui sixteen years earlier, a disaster which had resulted in the deaths of 400 people.

While it was being constructed, some worried that the lighthouse would cause more shipwrecks than it prevented, as lighthouses usually showed the way to safety rather than warning of danger as the Cape Wickham lighthouse was designed to do.  Nonetheless, the lighthouse was eventually completed, although shipwrecks frequently continued to occur until the Currie Lighthouse was completed in 1879.  Built from locally quarried stone, the lighthouse was staffed by a superintendent until the light was automated in the 1920s.  The superintendent often came into conflict with hunters and other established inhabitants of the island, with one 1873 report stating:

The superintendents were required to be extremely self-sufficient, as only one supply ship visited the site a year.  Some of the lightkeepers resorted to looting and theft to supplement these supplies, with one keeper being dismissed for storing goods that his brother had looted from a shipwreck.

In the 1920s, it was determined that it was no longer necessary for the light to be staffed on a full-time basis, and automation systems were added to the lighthouse.  At this time, a number of the surrounding buildings were also demolished, including the superintendent's residence. The lighthouse continued to be looked after by the lighthouse keeper from nearby Currie.

During preparations for the 150th anniversary of the lighthouse, it was discovered that it had never been officially opened.  To rectify this oversight, Australian Governor-General Quentin Bryce officially opened the lighthouse in a ceremony on 5 November 2011.

See also

 History of Tasmania
 List of lighthouses in Tasmania

References

External links

 Australian Maritime Safety Authority

Lighthouses completed in 1861
King Island (Tasmania)
Lighthouses in Tasmania
1861 establishments in Australia
Commonwealth Heritage List places in Tasmania
Tasmanian Heritage Register